Ski jumping at the 1997 Winter Universiade was held at the Jumping Park in Muju Resort in Muju, South Korea from January 26 to February 2, 1997.

Men's events

Medal table

References 

1997 Winter Universiade
1997
1997